Xenia is an ancient Greek concept of hospitality. It is almost always translated as 'guest-friendship' or 'ritualized friendship'. It is an institutionalized relationship rooted in generosity, gift exchange, and reciprocity. Historically, hospitality towards foreigners and guests (Hellenes not of your polis) was understood as a moral obligation. Hospitality towards foreign Hellenes honored Zeus Xenios (and Athene Xenia) patrons of foreigners. 

The rituals of hospitality created and expressed a reciprocal relationship between guest and host expressed in both material benefits (e.g. gifts, protection, shelter) as well as non-material ones (e.g. favors, certain normative rights). The word is derived from xenos 'stranger'.

The Greek god Zeus is sometimes called Zeus Xenios in his role as a protector of strangers. He thus embodied the moral obligation to be hospitable to foreigners and guests. Theoxeny or theoxenia is a theme in Greek mythology in which human beings demonstrate their virtue or piety by extending hospitality to a humble stranger (xenos), who turns out to be a disguised deity (theos) with the capacity to bestow rewards. These stories caution mortals that any guest should be treated as if potentially a disguised divinity and help establish the idea of xenia as a fundamental Greek custom. The term theoxenia also covered entertaining among the gods themselves, a popular subject in classical art, which was revived at the Renaissance in works depicting a Feast of the Gods.

Legally, xenia was a charge of bastardy. Attic lawsuits apply it to accuse someone of committing citizenship fraud perpetrated through marriage fraud. The Periclean citizenship law of 451/450 BC expanded the definition of bastardy to include the children of unions between Athenians and non-Athenians.

Overview 
Xenia consists of two basic rules: 
 The respect from hosts to guests. Hosts must be hospitable to guests and provide them with a bath, food, drink, gifts, and safe escort to their next destination. It is considered rude to ask guests questions, or even to ask who they are, before they have finished the meal provided to them.
 The respect from guests to hosts. Guests must be courteous to their hosts and not be a threat or burden. Guests are expected to provide stories and news from the outside world. Most importantly, guests are expected to reciprocate if their hosts ever call upon them in their homes.

Xenia was considered to be particularly important in ancient times when people thought that gods mingled among them. If one had poorly played host to a stranger, there was the risk of incurring the wrath of a god disguised as the stranger.  It is thought that the Greek practice of theoxenia may have been the antecedent of the Roman rite of Lectisternium, or the draping of couches.

While these practices of guest-friendship are centered on the gods, they would become common among the Greeks in incorporating xenia into their customs and manners. Indeed, while originating from mythical traditions, xenia would become a standard practice throughout all of Greece as a historical custom in the affairs of humans interacting with humans as well as humans interacting with the gods.

In the Iliad 

 The Trojan war described in the Iliad of Homer resulted from a violation of xenia. Paris, from the house of Priam of Troy, was a guest of Menelaus, king of Mycenaean Sparta, but seriously transgressed the bounds of xenia by abducting his host's wife, Helen. Therefore, the Achaeans were required by duty to Zeus to avenge this transgression, which, as a violation of xenia, was an insult to Zeus' authority.
 Diomedes and Glaucus meet in no man's land. However, Diomedes does not want to fight another man descendant from the Gods, so he asks Glaucus about his lineage. Upon revealing it, Diomedes realizes that their fathers had practiced xenia with each other, and they are guest-friends. Therefore, they decide not to fight, but to continue their hereditary guest-friendship by trading armor.
 Hector speaks to Ajax about exchanging presents so that people will remember them for dropping their hatred and becoming friends. While this is not a traditional example of xenia, it does demonstrate the power of friendship in the Greek culture.
 Book 9: Achilles invites Odysseus into his home and asks Patroclus to make the strongest wine for them to drink. Patroclus also brings meat with the wine. The men eat and have light chatter before Odysseus delivers Agamemnon's offer to Achilles.
 Book 18: Hephaestus hosts Thetis in his home. Concerned with making Thetis comfortable, Hephaestus lays out entertainment and puts away his tools.
 Book 24: In the last book of the Iliad, Priam supplicates Achilles in an attempt to get his son Hector back. Instead of turning him out as the enemy, Achilles abides by the rules of xenia and allows him to stay.

In the Odyssey 
Xenia is an important theme in Homer's Odyssey.

 Every household in the epic is seen alongside xenia:
 Odysseus' house is inhabited by suitors with demands beyond the bounds of xenia. 
 Menelaus and Nestor's houses are seen when Telemachus visits. 
 There are many other households observed in the epic, including those of Circe, Calypso, and the Phaeacians. 

 The Phaeacians, particularly Nausicaä, were famed for their immaculate application of xenia, as the princess and her maids offered to bathe Odysseus and then led him to the palace to be fed and entertained. After sharing his story with the Phaeacians they agree to take Odysseus to his home land. In a new rule, he states that you should not beat your host in a competition because it would be rude and could damage the relationship.

 Telemachus shows xenia, in Book One, to the disguised Athena by graciously welcoming her into his own home and offering her food. He even moves her chair away from the suitors who are rude. 

 Eumaeus the Swineherd shows xenia to the disguised Odysseus, claiming guests come under the protection of Zeus. When one of the suitors Ctesippus mocks the disguised Odysseus and hurls an ox's hoof at him as a "gift", mocking xenia, though Odysseus dodges this, Telemachus says if he had hit the guest, he would have run Ctesippus through with his spear. The other suitors are worried, saying Ctesippus is "doomed" if the stranger is a disguised god. As well as this, whenever Homer describes the details of "xenia", he uses the same formula every time: for example, the maid pouring wine into the gold cups, etc.
 An example of bad xenia occurs when Homer describes the suitors. They continue to eat Penelope and Telemachus out of house and home. They are rude not only to each other but to Telemachus and the guests, such as disguised Athena and Odysseus.
 Another excellent example of bad xenia is the cyclops Polyphemus. The cyclops breaks custom by asking Odysseus where he is from and what his name is the moment he meets him (it is proper for a host to first feed their guest before asking them questions). Then, not only does the cyclops not offer Odysseus's crew any food, he eats them and then refuses to let them leave.  
 Calypso, a fair goddess, had wanted to keep Odysseus in her cavern as her husband, but he refused. Circe had also failed to keep Odysseus in her halls as her mate.  Although both of these women had fine homes and fine things to offer him, their hospitality was too much for Odysseus. He instead left each with the goal of returning to Ithaca and reclaiming his family and his home. Sometimes Hospitality was unwanted or was given unwillingly.

In the Argonautica 
The Argonautica, written by Apollonius of Rhodes, takes place before the Iliad and the Odyssey. Since the story takes place during Greek times, the theme of xenia is shown throughout the story.

 When the Argonauts are warmly received by King Kyzicus of the Doliones who provides safe harbour and sacrificial materials to help the Argonauts consecrate a new altar to Apollo. In the opposite harbour xenia is violated by the monstrous earth-born who attack the Argonauts.
 The King of Bebrykians, Amykos, makes the Argonauts fight to be able to leave. Polydeukes volunteers himself to participate in the boxing match. This is a clear violation of xenia, and the Argonauts become worried when they reach their next destination later on in Book 2, when the Argonauts are on an island after a storm caused by Zeus. The Argonauts call out, asking for the strangers to be kind to them and treat them fairly. They realize that Jason and the men on the island are related by Jason's father's side of the family. The men provide clothing, sacrifice with them, and share a meal before the Argonauts leave the island in the morning.
 When Jason talks about going to Aietes' palace, he says that they will receive a warm welcome and surely he will follow the rules of xenia. 
 The first time the Argonauts reach Aietes' palace, also the first time Medeia is depicted in love with Jason due to Eros, Aietes has a feast prepared. The Argonauts are served, and after their meal Aietes begins to ask questions about the Argonauts' purpose and voyage to his kingdom.

Political alliances
Historian Gabriel Herman lays out the use of xenia in political alliances in the Near East.

Solemn pronouncements were often used to establish a ritualised personal relationship, such as when "Xerxes, having been offered lavish hospitality and most valuable gifts by Pythios the Lydian, declared "...in return for this I give you these privileges (gera): I make you my Xenos." The same set of words could be applied in non-face-to-face situations, when a ruler wished to contract an alliance through the intermediary of messengers. Herman points out that this is correspondent to pacts made by African tribal societies studied by Harry Tegnaeus (in his 1952 ethno-sociological book Blood Brothers) where "the partners proclaim themselves in the course of the blood ceremony each other's 'brothers', 'foster-brothers', 'cousins'. The surviving treaties of 'fraternity' 'paternity' and 'love and friendship' between the petty rulers of the ancient Near East in the second half of the second millennium B.C. incorporate what are probably written versions of such declarations." (Herman also sees an echo of this in the medieval ceremony of homage, in the exchange between a would-be-vassal and the lord.)

Herman goes on to point out that "no less important an element in forging the alliance was the exchange of highly specialized category of gifts, designated in our sources as xénia (as distinct from xenía, the term of the relationship itself) or dora. It was as important to give such gifts as to receive, and refusal to reciprocate as tantamount to a declaration of hostility. Mutual acceptance of the gifts, on the other hand, was a clear mark of the beginning of friendship." Herman points to the account of Odysseus giving Iphitos a sword and spear after having been given a formidable bow while saying they were "the first token of loving guest-friendship". Herman also shows that Herodotus holds "the conclusion of an alliance and the exchange of gifts appeared as two inseparable acts: Polykrates, having seized the government in Samos, "concluded a pact of xenia with Amasis king of Egypt, sending and receiving from him gifts (dora)". Within the ritual it was important that the return gift be offered immediately after receiving a gift with each commensurate rather than attempting to surpass each other in value. The initial gifts in such an exchange would fall somewhere between being symbolic but useless, and of high use-value but without any special symbolic significance. The initial gifts would serve as both object and symbol. Herman points out that these goods were not viewed as trade or barter, "for the exchange was not an end in itself, but a means to another end." While trade ends with the exchange, the ritual exchange "was meant to symbolize the establishment of obligations which, ideally, would last for ever."

Plato makes mention of Zeus Xenios while discussing his journey to meet Dion of Syracuse in The Seventh Letter.

In architecture
Vitruvius uses the word "xenia" once, near the end of Book 6 of De Architectura, in a note about the decorative paintings, typically of food, located in guest apartments: "when the Greeks became more luxurious, and their circumstances more opulent, they began to provide dining rooms, chambers, and storerooms of provisions for their guests from abroad, and on the first day they would invite them to dinner, sending them on the next chickens, eggs, vegetables, fruits, and other country produce. This is why artists called pictures representing the things which were sent to guests ‘xenia.’"Architectural theorist Simon Weir explained how Vitruvius refers to xenia at the beginning of Book 6 of De Architectura, in the anecdote of Aristippus shipwrecked and receiving hospitality from the Rhodians. Also how xenia was pervasive in the work of the earliest ancient Greek architects, whose work was always concerned with public buildings and the hosting of guests rather than the design of private residences. Architectural Historian, Lisa Landrum has also revealed the presence of Xenia in Greek theatre onstage and offstage.

In the Hebrew Bible

Several incidents recorded in the Hebrew Bible (Old Testament) are considered parallels to the Greek concept of theoxenia, whereby hospitality is shown to a stranger before they reveal their divine nature.
In Genesis 18, Abraham is visited by three men; Yahweh (God) is among them, but Abraham does not realise this at first, addressing him as Adonai ("my lord," a standard honorific for a guest) and provides them with bread, curds, milk and veal. In return, the Lord promises that his wife Sarah, who is elderly, will bear a son. (It is not clear who the other two men are; Christians have interpreted them as the persons of the Trinity.) The Lord then says he is going to Sodom and Gomorrah to investigate the magnitude of their sins; Abraham intercedes, and pleads with the Lord not to destroy the cities if there are ten good men there.
In Genesis 19, the two men (identified as מַּלְאָכִ֤ים mal’āḵîm, "messengers," angels) go to Sodom where Lot, a nephew of Abraham, makes them welcome and bakes them bread. The men of Sodom come to Lot's house and demand the visitors be turned over to them, apparently so that they can rape them. Lot refuses, and the angels strike the men blind. Lot and his family escape the city as God destroys it with sulfur and fire.

Writers distinguish between "positive theoxenies," in which the community treats the guest appropriately, and a "negative theoxeny," where the host receives the blessing of life rather than the death the unwelcoming public is cursed with. The theoxenies of Genesis 18–19 are an example of the influence of Hellenic culture on the ancient Israelites.

See also
 Hospitium - Greco-Roman tradition of hospitality.  
 Bellerophon, protected by xenia, even though falsely accused of raping his host wife.  
 Ixion, described in Greek mythology as a flagrant violator of xenia.  
 Xenos (Greek) - Stranger/Foreigner/Alien.  
  - Japanese tradition of hospitality, parallel of the Ancient Greek tradition Xenia.
 Grith, related concept in the modern Heathen religious movement.

References

Bibliography 

 Fagles, Robert, trans. 1990. Iliad. New York: Penguin.
 Lattimore, Richmond (2011). The Iliad of Homer. Chicago: University of Chicago Press. .
 Murray, A. T., trans. 1919. The Odyssey, by Homer. Cambridge, MA: Harvard University Press and London: William Heinemann. [two volumes].
 The Argonautika. Berkeley, CA: University of California Press (2007). .

 Some of this material comes from lectures by Dr. Elizabeth Vandiver, recorded and distributed by The Teaching Company.
Vandiver, Elizabeth, lecturer. (1999). The Iliad of Homer. [Audio CD]
— (1999). The Odyssey of Homer. [Audio CD]
— . (2000). Greek Tragedy Part I. [Audio CD]

External links
 Xenia A comic-strip explanation of the formula of Xenia or hospitality in Greek Epic by Greek Myth Comix

Ancient Greek culture
Greek words and phrases